PP-27 Jhelum-III is a Constituency of Provincial Assembly of Punjab.

Bye elections 2018

General elections 2018

See also
 PP-26 Jhelum-II
 PP-28 Gujrat-I

General Election 2013

External links
 Election commission Pakistan's official website
 Awazoday.com check result
 Official Website of Government of Punjab

Provincial constituencies of Punjab, Pakistan